Sretenka is a rural locality (a selo) in Kazansky Selsoviet of Seryshevsky District, Amur Oblast, Russia. The population was 40 as of 2018. There is 1 street.

Geography 
Sretenka is located 42 km west of Seryshevo (the district's administrative centre) by road. Kazanka is the nearest rural locality.

References 

Rural localities in Seryshevsky District